Stefan Szczurowski (born 17 April 1982, in Perth, Western Australia) is an Australian rower.

References
 

1982 births
Living people
Australian male rowers
Rowers from Perth, Western Australia
Olympic rowers of Australia
Rowers at the 2004 Summer Olympics
Olympic bronze medalists for Australia
Australian people of Polish descent
Olympic medalists in rowing
Medalists at the 2004 Summer Olympics